Fernando Correia (born 1880, date of death unknown) was a Portuguese fencer. He competed in the individual épée event at the 1912 and 1920 Summer Olympics.

References

External links
 

1880 births
Year of death missing
Portuguese male épée fencers
Olympic fencers of Portugal
Fencers at the 1912 Summer Olympics
Fencers at the 1920 Summer Olympics